Democratic Unity (Spanish: Unidad Demócrata; UD) was a center-left to center-right electoral and political coalition in Bolivia, formed on 17 June 2014 by the National Unity Front and the Social Democratic Movement to contest the 2014 general elections.

References 

2014 establishments in Bolivia
2020 disestablishments in Bolivia
Defunct political parties in Bolivia
Political parties established in 2014
Political parties disestablished in 2020
Bolivia